Molybdocene dichloride is the organomolybdenum compound with the formula (η5-C5H5)2MoCl2 and IUPAC name dichlorobis(η5-cyclopentadienyl)molybdenum(IV), and is commonly abbreviated as Cp2MoCl2. It is a brownish-green air- and moisture-sensitive powder. In the research laboratory, it is used to prepare many derivatives.

Preparation and structure
The compound is prepared from molybdocene dihydride by treatment with chloroform:
(C5H5)2MoH2 + 2 CHCl3 → (C5H5)2MoCl2 + 2 CH2Cl2

The compound adopts a "clamshell" structure where the Cp rings are not parallel, the average Cp(centroid)-M-Cp angle being 130.6°. The two chloride ligands are cis, the Cl-Mo-Cl angle of 82° being narrower than in niobocene dichloride (85.6°), which in turn is less than in zirconacene dichloride (92.1°). This trend helped to establish the orientation of the HOMO in this class of complex.

Uses
Unlike the titanocene and zirconacene derivatives, the molybdocene compounds have yielded no commercial applications.

All metallocene dihalides exhibit some anti-cancer activity, but these have not yielded useful compounds in the clinic.

References

Metal halides
Metallocenes
Organomolybdenum compounds
Chloro complexes
Cyclopentadienyl complexes
Molybdenum(IV) compounds